Cathal Carolan is a Gaelic footballer who plays for Crossmolina Deel Rovers and the Mayo county team.

He made his debut in the 2013 Connacht Senior Football Championship and came on as a substitute at half-time for Tom Cunniffe in the 2013 All Ireland final where Mayo lost by a point to Dublin.

References

Living people
Mayo inter-county Gaelic footballers
Year of birth missing (living people)